{{DISPLAYTITLE:C22H29FO4}}
The molecular formula C22H29FO4 (molar mass: 376.46 g/mol) may refer to:

 Desoximetasone
 Doxibetasol
 Fluocortolone
 Fluorometholone, also known as 6α-methyl-9α-fluoro-11β,17α-dihydroxypregna-1,4-diene-3,20-dione

Molecular formulas